Richard Harbert Smith (15 January 1894, Dillsboro, Indiana – 6 July 1957, Alexandria, Virginia) was a professor and researcher of aeronautical engineering at the Massachusetts Institute of Technology (MIT), from 1929 to 1945.

His academic education was developed at the Moores Hill College (BS, 1915), Indiana (today, University of Evansville); the Massachusetts Institute of Technology (SB, 1918), Cambridge (Greater Boston), Massachusetts; and the Johns Hopkins University (MA, 1928; PhD, 1929), Baltimore, Maryland.

After World War I, Prof. Smith worked as an assistant at the United States Naval Research Laboratory.  In 1929, he was an associate physicist at the Navy's laboratory when he was hired by the Massachusetts Institute of Technology as an associate professor of aeronautical engineering, being promoted to full professor in 1931.

For many years, he was Dr. Jerome Clarke Hunsaker's assistant administrator for aeronautical engineering at MIT.

During the World War II period, Prof. Smith coordinated the MIT Civilian Pilot Training Program and was also instructor for several classes of female engineering trainees for the Curtiss company.

In 1945, he left MIT to go to Brazil, hired by the Brazilian government, in a venture led by Casimiro Montenegro Filho, then lieutenant-colonel of the Brazilian Air Force, to establish an institute of aeronautics, the Instituto Tecnológico de Aeronáutica (Aeronautical Technology Institute), of which he became the first rector. This was an outstanding contribution to the scientific and technological education in Brazil.

References

External links
 University of Evansville (earlier Moores Hill College), Indiana.
 MIT Archives.
 Massachusetts Institute of Technology.
 Johns Hopkins University.
 Smith, R H - List of Technical Reports. NASA Technical Reports Server (NTRS).
 Dr. Jerome Clarke Hunsaker. Article from the Encyclopædia Britannica.
 Shatswell Ober, "The Story of Aeronautics at M.I.T., 1895 to 1960". Amazon.com site.
 Site of the Instituto Tecnológico de Aeronáutica (Aeronautical Technology Institute).
 MIT Museum.
 MIT Department of Aeronautics and Astronautics
 Richard Harbert Smith. Wiki of ITA Alumni.
 Smith, R. H. Conference "Brazil, future aviation power" (excerpts in Portuguese). Conference held on September 26, 1945, at the Brazilian Education Ministry auditorium, in Rio de Janeiro, invited by the Instituto Brasileiro de Aeronáutica (Brazilian Institute of Aeronautics). Site of the Departamento de Ciência e Tecnologia Aeroespacial - DCTA (Brazilian Department of Aerospace Science and Technology).

1894 births
1957 deaths
American aerospace engineers
Massachusetts Institute of Technology alumni
Johns Hopkins University alumni
People from Dillsboro, Indiana
20th-century American educators
Brazilian educators
20th-century American engineers